Daniel Anthony Watkins (24 February 1918 – 22 February 1982) was a notable New Zealand agrochemical distributor and manufacturer, businessman. He was born in New Plymouth, New Zealand, in 1918.

References

1918 births
1982 deaths
20th-century New Zealand businesspeople
People from New Plymouth